All Star Glam Exam is a Hong Kong game show produced by Television Broadcasts Limited (TVB). The premiere episode aired on the TVB Jade and TVB HD Jade channels on 27 February 2011 and is slated to run for 18 episodes. Hosted by the Cantopop band Grasshopper, the show also consists of assistant hosts Suyen Cheung, Candy Chang, Nadia Lun, and Nicole Wan, collectively known as "The Star Ladies."

All Star Glam Exam won two awards at the TVB Anniversary Awards, including Best Variety Show and Best Host for Grasshopper. The show also won Best Variety Show at the 2011 Yahoo! Asia Buzz Awards.

Show format
Each episode features various popular Hong Kong celebrities participating in games to win money and/or prizes. Unlike the Super Trio series, the games in All Star Glam Exam are less provocative. Games usually consists of solving puzzles, answering questions, guessing games, and judging.

Games
Round 1: King of Posing (明星Pose王)
Round 2: Glamorous Tasting Competition (華麗品味賽)
Round 3: The Great 'Grasshopper' Meal (蜢人飯局)
Round 4: Special games
Star Managers (明星經理人), with performers Ceci Tai, Cheronna Ng, Amy Chio (Episode 1)
Glamorous Gallery (華麗Gallery)
Glamorous Dance Hall (華麗舞廳)
Glamorous Garden (華麗花園)
Stars' Photo Gallery (明星照相館)
Round 5: Star Jackpot (明星Jackpot)

Viewership ratings
The following is a table that includes a list of the total ratings points based on television viewership. "Viewers in millions" refers to the number of people, derived from TVB Jade ratings (not including TVB HD Jade), in Hong Kong who watched the episode live. The peak number of viewers are in brackets.

List of episodes

References

External links
Official TVB Website 

TVB original programming
Chinese game shows
2011 Hong Kong television series debuts